John Cornwall (died 1608) was the member of the Parliament of England for Marlborough for the parliaments of 1571 and 1589. He was also mayor of Marlborough on multiple occasions.

References 

Members of Parliament for Marlborough
Year of birth unknown
Mayors of Marlborough
1608 deaths
English MPs 1571
English MPs 1589